Tau'ri characters in Stargate may refer to:

Tau'ri characters in Stargate SG-1
Tau'ri characters in Stargate Atlantis